The Knudson Brothers Building is a historic two-story commercial building in Brigham City, Utah. It was built in 1914 by Charles W. and Jonathan C. Knudson, and designed in the Chicago school style, with Neoclassical features. It is "55.5 feet wide by 100 feet deep with a small frame addition on the rear." It has been listed on the National Register of Historic Places since July 16, 1992.

References

	
National Register of Historic Places in Box Elder County, Utah
Chicago school architecture in the United States
Commercial buildings completed in 1914
1914 establishments in Utah